The 2005 Monza GP2 Series round was a GP2 Series motor race held on September 3 and 4, 2005 at the Autodromo Nazionale Monza in Monza, Italy. It was the tenth round of the 2005 GP2 Series season. The race weekend supported the 2005 Italian Grand Prix.

Classification

Qualifying

Feature race

Sprint race

Notes

References

Monza
GP2